The following is a comprehensive discography of From First to Last, an American post-hardcore band formed in 1999.

Studio albums

Extended plays

Singles

Music videos

Compilation appearances

References

Punk rock discographies